Cyclophora orboculata is a moth in the  family Geometridae. It is found in Madagascar.

References

Moths described in 1922
Cyclophora (moth)
Moths of Madagascar
Moths of Africa